Mirosternus carinatus is a species of beetle in the family Ptinidae, found in Hawaii.

References

Further reading

 

Ptinidae
Beetles described in 1881